Mississippi Highway 433 (MS 433) is a state highway in western Mississippi consisting of two segments.

Route description
The western segment of MS 433 begins in rural southern Sharkey County at U.S. Route 61 (US 61). The highway heads north on Omega Road crossing Deer Creek at a culvert. After it passes the one house located along this portion of the road, the poorly maintained asphalt surface becomes a dirt road. Heading east northeast, the highway crosses Little Sunflower River and enters Delta National Forest. Curving to the northeast, the road continues through woods before this segment of MS 433 ends at the intersection of Spanish Fort Road and Ten Mile Road. This segment of MS 433 is not signed and is not maintained by the state.

The signed eastern segment begins in town of Satartia just shy of the Satartia Lift Bridge. MS 433 heads east on Plum Street, then southeast on Richards Avenue. After crossing MS 3, the road leaves the flat agricultural area of the Mississippi Delta region to a wooded hilly area. The highway passes through the community of Mechanicsburg while in the wooded area of southern Yazoo County. The terrain of the highway flattens out as it enters the town of Bentonia where it intersects US 49 in the western portion of the town. MS 433 continues into town on Wilson Street before sharply curving to the south onto West Railroad Avenue. At Cannon Avenue, Mississippi Highway 830, MS 433 turns east to form a concurrency with MS 830. After crossing a railroad, MS 830 heads north along East Railroad Avenue while MS 433 continues northeast. MS 433 continues its northeasterly course through mostly farm fields, passing through the community of Myrlesville before turning north. In the community of Benton, MS 433 intersects MS 16 south of the community center. In the center, MS 433 turns to the east at Old Highway 16. Heading northeast, the highway intersects MS 432 at its western terminus. In the northern part of the county, MS 433 passes through the community of Midway. After crossing into Holmes County, the highway passes through Zeiglerville. The highway ends at an intersection with Ebenezer Coxburg Road.

History
MS 433 first appeared in the 1956 state highway map running from Satartia to MS 17 south of Lexington. Within the next year, it was extended from its southern terminus west to MS 16 in Holly Bluff. By 1960, the route was truncated at its north end at MS 14 near Ebenezer but was extended further south from Holly Bluff to US 61 in southern Sharkey County. In 1963, the segment between Holly Bluff and Satartia was deleted while the western segment was removed from state maintenance between 1965 and 1967. The route has generally remained unchanged since.

Major junctions

References

External links

433
Transportation in Sharkey County, Mississippi
Transportation in Yazoo County, Mississippi
Transportation in Holmes County, Mississippi